ORBO & The Longshots is a rock & roll band from Bergen, Norway. The band was established in the year 2000 by singer, songwriter, guitarist and producer Ole Reinert Berg-Olsen aka ORBO.

After ten years of endless driving, wet asphalt and band car on high octane band has learned the craft from the ground. To date, they have released 6 albums, and won the Norwegian equivalent to the American Grammy Award, Spellemannsprisen for their 2008 album "High Roller". The bands' releases can be found on Blue Mood Records / Grappa and Columbia.

The band disbanded in 2012 and ORBO continued as a solo artist.

Line up 
 Ole Reinert Berg-Olsen aka ORBO
 Ine Tumyr
 Reidar F. Opdal
 Stian Tumyr
 Paul Inge Vikingstad
 Magnus Åserud Skylstad

Honors 
Spellemannprisen 2008 in the class Blues

Discography 
2005: Seven (Blue Mood Records)

 2006: Dead Man Walking   EP

2006: Genuine Handmade Rock’n’Roll (Blue Mood Records)
2008: High Roller (Blue Mood Records), Awarded Spellemannprisen in the class Blues
2009: Masquerade (Columbia)
2010: Live 10 (Blue Mood Records)
2011: Prairie Moon (Bonus Tracks) EP (Blue Mood Records)
2011: Prairie Sun (Blue Mood Records)

References

External links 

Musical groups established in 2000
Spellemannprisen winners
2000 establishments in Norway
Musical groups from Bergen